Christopher Quinn may refer to:

 Christopher B. Quinn (born 1967), member of the Pennsylvania House of Representatives
 Christopher Dillon Quinn (born 1965), American film director, writer, and producer
 Chris Quinn (born 1983), American basketball player